Jocelyne Labylle (born 1973 in Saint-Claude, Guadeloupe) is a Guadeloupean zouk musician.

Career
In 1992 Labylle joined the group Elodie; in 1994 she joined Zouk Orchestra. She appeared on the covers of all their albums.

After performing on three of their albums, Labylle left to pursue a solo career. She teamed up with Federick Caracas, Harry Diboula, Jacob Desvarieux and Liso to record the single "Quand tu veux". Months later the album On verra was released.

In 2000 she returned to the studio to record her second album. The single "J'ai deposé les clefs" ("I left my keys") was released followed by the album Ma Petite Lumiere ("My little light"). The album features "Parle-moi d'elle" written by Harry Diboula.

In 2003, Labylle teamed up with Cheela, Passi and Jacob Desvarieux for the single "Laisse Parler Les Gens". The song sold more than 1 million copies and was nominated for a Victoires de la Musique award. In 2007 she collaborated with Haitian musician Roberto Martino of the compas group T-Vice for his single "J'aimerais te revoir".

Discography

Albums
 On verra (1998)
 Ma Petite Lumiere (2000)

Singles
 "Quand tu veux" (1998)
 "J'ai depose les clefs" (2000)
 "Jusqu'au bout" (2000)
 "Laisse Parler Les Gens" (2003)
 "Day'O" (2004)

References 

2012 on serravir

External links 
Rfi musicue: biography

Living people
1973 births
Guadeloupean musicians
French musicians